Celia Freijeiro García (Vigo, February 9, 1983) is a Spanish film, theater and television actress and producer.

Biography 
She was born in Vigo, Galicia, in a family with an artistic vocation: her father, Rafael Freijeiro, is a Galician painter. After graduating from DeWitt High School in Arkansas (United States), she moved to Madrid where she began her training and career as an actress.

She made the leap to professional theater with Paloma Pedrero's play El color de agosto which she starred in and produced herself. For her performance in this text she was nominated for two of the most important theater awards in Spain: the Valle Inclán Theater Awards and the Mayte Award. Since then she has participated in numerous theatrical productions, television series and films.

In 2006, at the age of 23, she created Desnudo Azul, a cultural association that in 2008 will become his own production company, PocaPena Productions. To date, with Pocapena she has produced numerous plays, several short films and a feature film.

In 2010 she became a member of the board of the Sociedad Cervantina (Calle Atocha 87, Madrid) and in 2017 she became its vice-president. Thanks to social networks, in February 2017, we were able to learn that construction work was beginning on her own theater, the Cervantes Chamber Theater, located in the Cervantina Society, which opened its doors in 2019.

Professional career 
She has been in charge of conducting six times the Gala of the Valle Inclán Theater Awards at the Teatro Real (Madrid), being in 2014 nominated for the award for her performance in the play Los Cenci by Antonin Artaud at the Teatro Español.

She has been a member of the critics and jury of numerous film and theater contests and festivals with a long history in Spain, during several of its editions.

She participated in the 28th and 29th editions of the Spanish Film Gala, presenting the Goya Award for Best Special Effects.

In December 2012 she was shortlisted for Best Leading Actress at the 2013 Goya Awards for her performance in the film Todo es silencio by José Luis Cuerda.

In November 2015 she was shortlisted again for the 2016 Goya Awards for her performance in two feature films in 2015. Best Leading Actress for De chica en chica by Sonia Sebastián and Best Supporting Actress for La playa de los ahogados by Gerardo Herrero.

With her performance as Adela Silva in the series Seis hermanas (2015-2017) she achieved considerable acclaim, both in Spain and Latin America. At the beginning of 2018 her inclusion was announced to the episodes of the second season of the series Servir y proteger of TVE, beginning to be broadcast in February. At the same time, news came that the actress would be part of the cast of the new series of Boomerang TV for La 1, La Otra Mirada vindictive, feminist fiction and starring mostly women, starting on April 25. The actress participated in November 2018 in Gigante 3, experimental theater festival of contemporary classics, organized by the Cervantine Society, appearing in the play Sangre Forzada, within the show Herejes. By the end of the year it was known that Celia would star in the new series of Leticia Dolera, Vida Perfecta, to be broadcast on Movistar Plus.  The first chapter of this series will premiere in April this year, during the Cannes Film Festival 2019, where it competes in the Official CanneSeries Section as Vida Perfecta.

Theater

Television

Television series

Web series

Short films

Cinema

Awards and nominations 

Throughout her more than 10 years of career she has been shortlisted for numerous prestigious awards such as the Goya Awards, Actors Union Awards and Mestre Mateo Awards:

 2017

 Shortlisted for the Actors Union Awards for Best Actress in a Leading Role (Television) for Seis hermanas for Televisión Española.

 2016

 Shortlisted for the Mestre Mateo Award for Best Female Supporting Actress for La playa de los ahogados by Gerardo Herrero.
 Triple shortlisted for the Actors Union Awards for Best Supporting Actress (Film) for La playa de los ahogados by Gerardo Herrero, Best Leading Actress (Television) for Seis hermanas by Televisión Española and Best New Actress (Film) for De chica en chica by Sonia Sebastián.

 2015

 Doubly shortlisted for the 2016 Goya Awards for Best Supporting Actress for Gerardo Herrero's La playa de los ahogados and Best Leading Actress for Sonia Sebastian's De chica en chica.

 2013

 Shortlisted for the Actors Union Awards for Best Actress in a Motion Picture for Todo es silencio by José Luis Cuerda.

 2012

 Shortlisted for the 2013 Goya Awards for Best Actress in a Leading Role for Todo es silencio by José Luis Cuerda.

Awards Ceremony 

 2018

 Jury in the XV edition of the Buero Young Theater Award for the Coca-Cola Foundation.
 In charge of conducting the gala of the Valle Inclán Theater Awards at the Teatro Real (Madrid).

 2017

 IV edition of the Platino Awards: she presents the Platinum Award for Best Staging Direction to Bernat Vinaplana and Jaume Martí, for Un monstruo viene a verme.
 In charge of awarding the Third Prize, in the school category, in the 14th edition of the Buero Youth Theater Award.
 Jury in the IX Short Film Contest of Radio Nacional de España.
 Jury in the XIV edition of the Buero Youth Theater Award for the Coca-Cola Foundation.
 In charge of conducting the gala of the Valle Inclán Theater Awards at the Teatro Real (Madrid).

 2016

 Jury in the XIII edition of the Buero Young Theater Award for the Coca-Cola Foundation.
 Jury in the XVI Lanzarote International Film Festival, in the International Fiction Short Film section, also awarding the prize to the winner in this category.
 In charge of conducting the gala of the Valle Inclán Theater Awards at the Teatro Real (Madrid).
 In charge of presenting the San Pancracio Revelation Actor Award to Miguel Herrán at the XXIII Festival Solidario de Cine Español de Cáceres (Cáceres, Spain).
 At the XI edition of the Lienzo de Picasso Awards, she presents the award for Best Actor in a Dramatic Series together with Marta Larralde.

 2015

 Presenter of the VII Yo Dona Beauty Awards.
 Presenter of the Audience Award for Best Documentary and the Audience Award for Best Feature Film at the closing gala of the 20th Andalesgai Film Festival.
 Jury of the Cuida de ti de Mía Awards
 Jury in the XII edition of the Buero Young Theater Award for the Coca-Cola Foundation.
 In charge of conducting the gala of the Valle Inclán Theater Awards at the Teatro Real (Madrid).
 XXIX edition of the Goya Awards: in charge of presenting the Goya for Best Special Effects to El niño together with Hiba Abouk and Marc Clotet.

 2014

 In charge of presenting the Sauce de Oro Award to La Escuela de Teatro Pilar Rey de La Palma at the X Festival de Teatro Amateur Villa de El Sauzal together with Las Grotesqués.
 Jury in the XI edition of the Buero Young Theater Award for the Coca-Cola Foundation.
 Awarded the Alicante Cinema Special Mention at the Alicante Film Festival.
 XXVIII edition of the Goya Awards: in charge of delivering the Goya for Best Special Effects to Las brujas de Zugarramurdi together with Carlos Santos.

 2013

 In charge of conducting the Valle Inclán Theater Awards Gala at the Teatro Real (Madrid).

 2012

 Jury of the second edition of the Cervantes Short Theater Awards, at the Cervantine Society.
 In charge of conducting the Gala of the Valle Inclán Theater Awards at the Teatro Real (Madrid).

 2011

 Presenter of the first edition of the Cervantes Short Theater Awards at the Cervantes Society.
 In charge of conducting the gala of the Valle Inclán Theater Awards at the Teatro Real (Madrid).
 Jury in the V edition of the Digital Festival El Sector, international short film contest in Madrid.

 2009

 Short Film Jury at the VII edition of the Cans Festival.

Projects as a producer

References

External links 
 Celia Freijeiro on IMDb

Spanish television actresses
Living people
1983 births
21st-century Spanish actresses
Spanish film actresses
Actresses from Galicia (Spain)